Dowson was launched in Aberdeen in 1804. She spent 10 years as a transport, presumably for the government. Between 1814 and 1819 she disappeared from the registers, though ship arrival and departure data suggests some activity from 1817 on. From 1819 on she traded to Africa, and elsewhere. She wrecked in the St Lawrence in 1824.

Career
Dowson first appeared in Lloyd's Register (LR) in 1804.

Between 1814 and 1819 Dowson disappeared from the registers. She reappeared in 1819. LR showed her having undergone work on her topsides and bends in 1818, and having had a large repair in 1819. The Register of Shipping (RS) gave her name as Dowsons, and reported repairs in 1817.

Fate
Dowson was lost on 9 May 1824 in the Saint Lawrence River. British Queen rescued the crew.

Citations and references
Citations

References
 
 

1804 ships
Ships built in Aberdeen
Age of Sail merchant ships of England
Maritime incidents in May 1824